Night Ranger is an American hard rock band, formed in San Francisco, California in 1979 by Jack Blades, Kelly Keagy and Brad Gillis. A year later Alan Fitzgerald and Jeff Watson joined completing their original lineup. Their discography consists of 13 studio albums, nine live albums, six compilation albums and 16 singles.

Albums

Studio albums

Live albums
Live in Japan (1990)
Rock in Japan '97 (1997)
Rock Breakout Years: 1984 (2005)
The Best of Night Ranger Live (2006)
Night Ranger Live (2007)
Extended Versions (2007)
Rockin' Shibuya 2007 (2008)
24 Strings & a Drummer (Live & Acoustic) (2012)
35 Years and a Night in Chicago (2016) #15 on Hard Rock Albums Chart

Compilation albums
Greatest Hits (1989) (RIAA: Gold)
Rock Masterpiece Collection (1998)
Keep Rockin': Best Selection '97–'98 (1998)
20th Century Masters: The Millennium Collection – The Best of Night Ranger (2000)
Hits, Acoustic & Rarities (2005)
Icon (2015)

Singles

†"Forever All Over Again" Bubbled Under the Hot 100 at #2.

Video Albums

Music videos 
 1982: "Don't Tell Me You Love Me"
 1982: "Sing Me Away"
 1983: "(You Can Still) Rock in America"
 1983: "When You Close Your Eyes"
 1983: "Sister Christian"
 1985: "Sentimental Street"
 1985: "Goodbye"
 1985: "Four in the Morning"
 1987: "The Secret of My Success"
 1987: "Hearts Away"
 1987: "Color of Your Smile"
 1988: "I Did It for Love"
 1997: "New York Time"
 1998: "Sign of the Times"
 2011: "Growing Up in California"
 2014: "High Road"
 2014: "Knock Knock Never Stop"
 2017: "Day and Night"
 2017: "Running Out of Time"
 2018: "Truth"
 2021: "Breakout"
 2021: "Bring It All Home to Me"

References

External links 
 

Discographies of American artists
Heavy metal group discographies
Night Ranger albums